M.G. Gordon (August 10, 1915 – February 16, 1969) was a Chicago businessman, inventor, and social theorist. Gordon also was a futurist and an advocate for privacy rights, a cause that he advocated through his writings and public speaking during the 1960s. Gordon built several profitable businesses during the years of the Great Depression. He also designed and created a safety lever device for hydraulic machine presses to improve worker safety. This was first put to use in his primary manufacturing facility. Then, during the 1930s and thereafter, mechanical production engineers copied and put Gordon's development to use in factories throughout the Midwest. As an industrialist during the 1940s and 1950s, Gordon adopted various public service social policies that benefited the families of workers.

During the relatively low-tech era of telephone party lines, Gordon predicted the advent of such modern day telecommunication advances as hand held, personal phones that would bounce their signals off of satellites. Gordon also was an astute evaluator of commercial value within the communication industry. He accumulated a large investment portfolio by the time that he quit the business world due to a heart attack at 46. Gordon died at 54.

Childhood and early years 
Gordon was born on a tenant farm in Gary, Indiana, in 1915. He lived there as a young boy until his family moved to Chicago. There, his parents opened a grocery store on Archer Avenue, located south of Cicero. In Chicago, besides the grocery store, Gordon's father, Victor, went into partnership with a W.O. Sommers to develop and grow a food-processing and distribution business, the W.O. Sommers Company. In Europe, the partners purchased harvests of cherries, olives and other bulk food items, which they bottled or canned under many labels, including the Monarch brand, and then sold to grocers, including numerous Jewell T Food Stores outlets throughout the Chicago area.

Admitted to the University of Chicago at 16, he began honing his entrepreneurial skills during the depression years and went on to study law at night at the Chicago-Kent College of Law, now the law school of the Illinois Institute of Technology.

In business 
Gordon graduated from law school at 19, too young to be permitted to take the bar examination to become a lawyer. Instead, he and a high school friend, M.J. Levine, went to work as salespersons for a sugar supply company. (At 21, the minimum legal age, Gordon successfully took the bar exam and became a member of the Illinois Bar.) Gordon and his friend later acquired the profitable sugar company where they had begun their commercial careers. The sugar company purchased bulk sugar from Caribbean plantations and sold it to Chicago grocers by the truckload before and during World War II. Spurred on by the travails of the Depression, Gordon and his partner pledged to share the proceeds of their annual incomes on a 50–50 basis, as well as any profits from their various business enterprises. Both men honored this unusual agreement.

In the 1930s Gordon went into business for himself, starting up the United Packing & Gasket Company. His factory, located in Cicero, originally was a government confiscated Al Capone distillery during the Volstead Act years. Gordon's company manufactured gaskets and other components for the automotive industry. During World War II Gordon refitted his operation to produce replacement parts for U.S. military vehicles and speaker rings for battlefield radios. In the post sputnik period, Gordon manufactured specially designed absorbent parts used for the US government's rocket program.

While Gordon was expanding his gasket company, he helped grow the Gordon family food processing operation and his other investment interests to purchase a paper mill in Hannibal, Missouri, the boyhood home of author Mark Twain and the locale for his two most famous novels, The Adventures of Tom Sawyer and The Adventures of Huckleberry Finn. Gordon used the paper products manufactured at this Missouri plant in the production of gaskets and related items at his Illinois factory.

At the same time that Gordon was expanding his gasket and paper manufacturing operations, he also retained ownership rights in the W.O. Sommers food processing company as well as his future interest in the sugar supply company which his partner maintained. When Victor Gordon died, his rights to the well-established W.O. Sommers Company passed on to his three children, including M.G. Gordon.

Gordon's abiding concern for the welfare of his workers led the industrialist to conceive of a pay benefit that he made available to his employees and their families. Many of Gordon's workers would socialize at a local tavern after work on payday Fridays, and then proceed to a nearby racetrack after drinks. There, some of the workers would gamble and occasionally lose their entire paychecks. To mitigate this problem, Gordon instituted a singular social exchange in which the spouses of his workers could come to the plant early on Fridays and get 50 percent advances on the weekly salaries of their mates. This policy ensured that the families of workers who gambled would still have money for bills and expenses. As a result of his progressive worker friendly policies, Gordon's workers never unionized or struck his plants during his lifetime.

Inventions 
When Gordon started up his gasket operations, hydraulic machine presses were extremely dangerous. Workers sometimes lost hands or arms in this bone-crunching equipment. Gordon therefore redesigned the two-story-tall machine presses at his plant so they would not function unless a worker pushed a button with one hand while activating a newly installed lever with another, thus tying up both hands and arms at the same time. This safety feature prevented workers from inadvertently placing an idle hand or arm inside the presses when they were in operation. Gordon's adaptation of his machine presses eventually became known in the industrial Midwest. Detroitauto manufacturers sent a team of engineers to Gordon's plant to inspect his retrofitted machine presses on a first-hand basis. Later, they adapted Gordon's design at their own plants. Operating from a concern for worker safety, Gordon was content to let the potentially lucrative patent rights to his safety lever design pass into the public domain.

During World War II, the U.S. government rationed many vital commodities. Gordon's plant required large quantities of cork, a controlled item, and a necessary raw material for the gaskets that were manufactured there for the domestic market. To solve this raw materials shortage Gordon developed a process to create synthetic cork from crushed peanut shells. Like his machine press improvement, Gordon allowed his patentable rights for this process to vest in the public domain.

Investments 
Gordon purchased stock in small to mid-size telephone companies and exchanges throughout the Midwest during the 1930s, 40s, and 50s. Eventually, these companies were consolidated into AT&T's or Continental Telephone's massive operations. This increased the value of Gordon's holdings. During his retirement years, revenues from Gordon's investment portfolio in the burgeoning telecommunication industry surpassed revenues from his business interests during his working career. The portfolio's value, managed by various trusts for the benefit of his wife Goldye Gordon and their five children increased since his death.

The telephone 
Beginning when he was a young man and throughout his life, Gordon was fascinated with the telephone. He saw it as more than a mere communication device, believing that the telephone had the capability to truly level society. For Gordon, an outspoken advocate for social equality, the telephone made all people equal, at least during the virtual experience when they were in communication with one another. over the phone lines, according to Gordon, such issues that stratify society as race, social status, and ethnicity become moot. Instead, he believed that the telephone, more than any other technical development, had the capability to bring people together as equals, no matter who they might be. Gordon envisioned the quickly expanding telephone network as the ideal social network. His prescient 1950s-'60s theorizing regarding the telephone anticipated such popular modern-day Internet social networks as Facebook and MySpace.

Gordon developed a social/psychological theory that, thanks to the telephone, people can feel free to exhibit two personalities – one for everyday life conversation and another goal directed personality for business and professional exchange. Indeed, because the customary cues that differentiate individuals have little or no relevance during telephone conversations, people can feel free to adopt various enhanced personas over the phone that would be psychologically impossible for them to assume during face-to-face conversations. "On the phone, you are able to become the very best person that you can possibly be," Gordon said. During his retirement, Gordon conducted pro bono discussion groups of these ideas with students at the University of Wisconsin, the University of Oklahoma and Baylor University. Until his death, Gordon followed up with participating students to assess their progress in implementing these ideas with annual telephone calls.

Gordon's early prognostications regarding assumed personalities in virtual environments have relevance in today's highly wired world. Many people now routinely adopt enhanced personalities during email, internet chat sessions, text messaging, and related electronic communication venues that reflect their ideal selves.

During the 1950s, Gordon anticipated the modern era of cell phones. He believed that people would eventually possess their own wireless, handheld telephonic devices; and that such equipment would communicate back and forth via satellite transmissions. Of course, Gordon's prescient views regarding telephony are now a commercial reality. Although one idea that he had, which was that people at birth would be assigned their own individual phone numbers for life, is no closer to becoming reality now than when Gordon first proposed it in the 1950s. Before he died, Gordon was writing a book, to be entitled Success at Arm's Reach.

Privacy rights 
After a heart attack at 46, Gordon recuperated at his residence in Highland Park, Illinois. Highland Park, with its tree lined streets nestled on Lake Michigan, was an excellent venue for him to contemplate his future. Highland Park hosts the tranquil Ravinia Park music festival which is the oldest in North America. The city was and continues to be a retreat for public luminaries who value personal privacy such as Chicago Bears Hall of Fame Quarterback Sid Luckman and Chicago Bulls basketball star Michael Jordan.

The first telephone call Gordon received during his Highland Park convalescence was from someone attempting to sell cemetery plots. This energized him to quickly take up the cause of privacy rights. Gordon began to think about the issue of privacy in the broader context of civil rights. For Gordon, unsolicited calls from sales and similar organizations, trying to peddle their products, services and (sometimes crackpot) causes over the phone, represented a rank invasion of privacy.

Additionally, Gordon believed that the instantaneous accessibility the phone made possible represented a dangerous potential that a foreign government or any unscrupulous commercial entity, could easily abuse. (of course, Gordon's heightened privacy concerns during the 1960s parallel the level of umbrage – indeed, even outrage – that exists today regarding the annoying automated telephone calls and E-mail spam that people must endure.) Gordon began to write about this topic. one of his articles, entitled "Invasion of Privacy: The Unsolicited Telephone Call," was published in the International Journal of Law and Science. Gordon also became an active public speaker on the topic of privacy rights. One presentation he made on this topic was before a meeting of the International Academy of Law and Science. Gordon worked to disseminate his views on privacy rights in other ways. This included  interviews on American and Canadian radio stations.

In addition to privacy rights, Gordon also advocated civil and political rights. During the 1960s, he tried to help an oppressed family flee Communist Czechoslovakia. At the time Czechoslovakia was a brutal police state that did not permit normal immigration. Gordon's assistance involved communicating in code with the Czech family through the pre-arranged placement of different-imaged postage stamps on airmail letters. Unfortunately, despite Gordon's concerted efforts, the Czech family was unable to escape from the Iron Curtain country.

Professional honors 
Gordon was a Fellow in the American Judicature Society and in the International Academy of Law and Science.

Personal 
M.G and Goldye Gordon had five children: Sandy, Judy, Barbara, Robert, and Alan.

See also
 Virtual reality
 Social networking
 Robert Gordon (psychologist)
 Social thought
 Bill of rights
 Food industry

References

External links
 History of the telephone
 Telephony
 Privacy rights
 Hydraulic presses
 Paper gaskets
 Personality theory

Futurologists
Businesspeople from Chicago
University of Chicago alumni
Illinois Institute of Technology alumni
1915 births
1969 deaths
20th-century American businesspeople
Chicago-Kent College of Law alumni